Donchery is a commune in the Ardennes department in northern France.

Population

See also
Communes of the Ardennes department
List of medieval bridges in France

References

Communes of Ardennes (department)
Ardennes communes articles needing translation from French Wikipedia